The seven-banded armadillo (Dasypus septemcinctus), also known as the Brazilian lesser long-nosed armadillo, is a species of armadillo from South America found in Paraguay, Argentina, Bolivia and Brazil.
It is a solitary nocturnal, terrestrial animal, living mostly in dry habitats, outside of rainforest regions.

Description
Long-nosed armadillos have a broad, depressed body, an obtusely pointed rostrum, long, pointed ears and short legs. The carapace consists of two immobile plates, separated by six or seven movable bands, which are connected to each other by a fold of hairless skin. The carapace is mostly blackish, hairless and with the scales of the anterior edge of the movable bands not notably different in colour from the rest of the dorsum. Lateral scutes have dark blackish-pink centres only slightly discernible from the rest of the carapace, but never as obviously pale as in the nine-banded armadillo. Scutes on the movable bands are triangular in shape, but those on the main plates are rounded. The number of scutes present on the fourth movable band varies from 44 to 52, with a mean of 48.4.

Reproduction
Females give birth to seven to nine genetically identical offspring.

References

 Arne å. Hammons and Francois Feör, 1997 - Neotropical Rainforest Mammals, A Field Guide.
 Cope ED 1889 - On the Mammalia Obtained by the Naturalist Exploring Expedition to Southern Brazil - American Naturalist 23: p128-150.
 Gardner AL 2007 - Mammals of South America Vol 1: Marsupials, Xenarthrans, Shrews and Bats - University of Chicago Press, Chicago.
 

Armadillos
Mammals of Argentina
Mammals of Bolivia
Mammals of Brazil
Mammals of Paraguay
Fauna of the Pantanal
Least concern biota of South America
Mammals described in 1758
Taxa named by Carl Linnaeus